is a 2014 Japanese period-style action fantasy film directed by Kentarō Ōtani and Keiichi Satō. The film is based on the manga of the same name by Yana Toboso.

Plot
The film is set in a parallel, quasi-Victorian history. The world contains two major powers: the West, ruled by the Queen, and the East. The Queen manipulates events worldwide using operatives called the Queen's Watchdogs. The film's protagonist, Earl Kiyoharu Genpou (replacing Ciel Phantomhive from the anime), is a Queen's Watchdog in an unnamed Eastern metropolis. A large automobile is careering through a docks area. The man driving is rapidly desiccating, his face wrinkling, its skin crumbling. As he dies, the car crashes to a halt. A warehouse echoes with screams as dark-clad men herd young women around. The chief thug questions one young woman for carrying photos of desiccated bodies. A young man in a formal black butler's uniform suddenly appears in the warehouse, identifying himself as a servant of the Genpou family. The thugs attack. Most are disabled or killed quickly. Only the chief thug remains conscious for questioning.

The next day, the young woman earlier questioned in the warehouse appears dressed as a young gentleman, in the role of Earl Kiyohara Genpou, the only son and heir of the Funtom Toy Company fortune. The earl's servants are present, including Sebastian Michaelis (the Black Butler from the previous night's battle), the clumsy maid Rin, and the house stewards Tanaka. The Earl speaks with the Queen's personal secretary Charles B. Sato about the death of the Queen's ambassador Anthony Campelle, found overnight on the docks, mummified in his car. The unusual cause of death, and the presence of a card depicting a devil, mark it as the eighth similar mysterious death of a powerful citizen in a case called the Devil's Curse. All victims have some connection with the human smuggler from the warehouse. No motivation for the deaths is apparent, however, nor is a root cause of the desiccating symptoms. The Queen demands a quick close to the case.

At the Eastern Ministry for State Security, Bureau of Foreign Affairs, a senior official greets the visiting policeman Tokizawa. A coat button found at the warehouse massacre implicates a Watchdog of the Queen in the fracas. Tokizawa is told that if a Watchdog exists, he represents a danger to the nation and should be disposed of. Tokizawa is then warned to pretend he heard nothing about the connection between the warehouse and the Watchdog, nor about the Watchdog's proposed elimination or else the Queen will know about it. Tokizawa and a few officers learn that the Genpou Family were once called the Phantomhive family from England before the family moved to Japan and change their family name to Genpou. The Earl and Sebastian examine Campelle's corpse. Clues found there lead them to an underground club of the wealthy. The Earl infiltrates the club using help from her aunt, with the maid Rin posing as her escort. Sneaking behind closed doors, the Earl and maid are captured and subdued by Shinpei Kujo, CEO of Epsilon Pharmaceuticals, host of the party.

Kujo talks with a hooded figure about Necrosis, a poisonous new drug. Party guests begin inhaling Necrosis. After a brief moment of euphoria they begin bleeding from nose, ears, and eyes as desiccation sets in. A henchman displays a familiar devil card, along with a bowl of red capsule, consuming two of which will cancel the effects of the Necrosis poison. The hooded figure suddenly kills Kujo and leaves. At the same time, Sebastian searches a series of darkened laboratories. A booby trap explodes near him, destroying the side of the lab building. The butler survives and rescues the Earl and the maid Rin from the scene of the Necrosis poisoning. Tokizawa takes Sebastian for interrogation; however, Sebastian beats up the police and escapes. The Earl travels with her aunt to a room near the exorcism ceremony. The aunt admits to being the hooded figure who killed Kujo, as well as the masked figure who years ago killed the Earl's parents and the bio-terrorist who will soon kill the gathered elite with a Necrosis bomb. Sebastian saves the Earl from her aunt's attack and tricks the aunt into succumbing to Necrosis.

On the roof of the building, the Earl guesses the combination of the briefcase bomb and disarms it. The Black Butler kisses the Earl, treating her for Necrosis exposure in the process, and takes her home with the remaining Necrosis capsules from the bomb. Later, at the office of policeman Tokizawa, a box arrives with a hand-written note. In it are the remaining Necrosis capsules, a sign that the terrorist danger has been dispelled and the Genpou family are not his enemies. Meanwhile, at Eastern Ministry for State Security, Bureau of Foreign Affairs, a senior official gets a note that the Earl is alive and well and revealing to be a member of the crime syndicate that attacked the Genpou family. Sebastian puts the Earl to bed and she orders him to stay with her until she falls asleep.

Cast
 Hiro Mizushima as Sebastian Michaelis, the "Black Butler"
 Ayame Goriki as Earl Kiyohara Genpou (Genpō Shiori), the Queen's Watchdog 
 Yūka as Wakatsuki Hanae, Shiori's aunt
 Mizuki Yamamoto as Rin/Lyn, the housemaid
 Tomomi Maruyama as Akashi, the house steward
 Masato Ibu as Kuzo Shinpei
 Takuro Ono as Matsumiya Takaki
 Yu Shirota as Charles Bennett Sato

Production
The film changes the setting of the original manga which was set in 19th-century London to an unnamed Eastern nation in the year 2020. The film stars Mizushima Hiro as Sebastian the lead, his first starring role in three years.

Release
Black Butler was released in Japan on January 18, 2014. The film debuted at third place on its opening weekend in the Japanese Box office being beaten by Trick The Movie: Last Stage and The Eternal Zero.

Reception
Derek Elley of Film Business Asia gave the film a three out of ten rating calling it "a failure at every level", noting that the film was "stodgily directed, appallingly constructed (with an especially confusing exposition) and laden down with yards of flat dialogue. When any action does finally come, it's just so-so.". The Guardian gave the film three stars out of five, noting that "Much of the dialogue and performances are stilted, but as a kitsch cult watch it has its charms." The Times awarded the film three stars out of five, describing it as "compellingly weird".

See also
 List of films based on manga

Notes

External links
 
 

Japanese alternate history films
Black Butler
Demons in film
Japanese films about revenge
Films about terrorism in Asia
Films directed by Kentarō Ōtani
Films set in 2020
Films set in Asia
Funimation
2014 science fiction action films
Japanese science fiction action films
Live-action films based on manga
Japanese splatter films
2010s Japanese-language films
2010s Japanese films